Nicholas Staikos (born 4 July 1986) is an Australian politician. He has been a Labor Party member of the Victorian Legislative Assembly since November 2014, representing the Legislative Assembly seat of Bentleigh.

Career 
In 2005, Staikos was elected to Glen Eira Council. At 19, he was the youngest person ever elected to that council. He was re-elected in 2008, but resigned in 2009 following the passage of legislation that banned people employed by members of Parliament from serving in local government. Following his resignation, he was appointed an honorary life member of the East Bentleigh Senior Citizens Club in recognition of his service. He was also appointed President of Godfrey Street Community House.

Staikos has worked for a number of MPs in state and federal parliaments, including Simon Crean, Clare O'Neil, Judith Graley and Ann Barker.

He was elected to the Victorian Parliament in 2014 in the seat of Bentleigh by a margin of just 0.8 per cent. During Staikos' first term, the electorate underwent significant changes, including the removal of three level crossings, major upgrades to schools and the return of St Kilda Football Club to Moorabbin. He was easily re-elected in 2018, achieving a swing of more than 11 per cent. Following this election, Staikos was appointed Secretary of the State Parliamentary Labor Party and Deputy Government Whip. He was appointed Parliamentary Secretary to the Treasurer in 2020 and Parliamentary Secretary to the Premier in 2022.

Staikos graduated from Monash University in 2009 with a BA (Hons).

Staikos is of Greek descent.

Originally a member of Labor Right, Staikos defected to Labor Left along with six of his colleagues shortly after the 2022 Victorian state election; the defections of his colleagues and himself meant that Labor Left constituted a majority of the state Labor caucus.

References

External links

 Parliamentary voting record of Nick Staikos at Victorian Parliament Tracker

1986 births
Living people
Australian Labor Party members of the Parliament of Victoria
Members of the Victorian Legislative Assembly
Monash University alumni
Australian people of Greek descent
21st-century Australian politicians
Labor Left politicians
People from Bentleigh, Victoria
Politicians from Melbourne